Sigela brauneata is a species of moth in the family Erebidae first described by Louis W. Swett in 1913. It is found in North America.

The MONA or Hodges number for Sigela brauneata is 8432.

References

Further reading

External links

 

Scolecocampinae
Articles created by Qbugbot
Moths described in 1913